Erich Hackl (born 26 May 1954 in Steyr, Upper Austria) is an Austrian novelist and short story writer. His works have been translated into English, Spanish, French, Czech and Hebrew though he is significantly better known in the German-speaking world. Many of his works, notably Sara und Simón, bear resemblance to Latin-American testimonial literature, and as such have been the focus of scholarly research by Latin Americanists.

His work has also been well received in the UK. A review in The Times Literary Supplement called The Wedding in Auschwitz “an exceptional book” because the author “has chosen not to conceal the documentary origins of his novel. Rather than producing a researched-based fictionalized account, honouring history and abiding by the literary conventions, he has given himself entirely to the subject … a remarkable suppression of the authorial ego … Hackl does not impose a novelist’s order … and yet the tension of the story never fails, interest never wanes. This is because Hackl understands that any ambiguity about detail is in contrast to an unshakeable sense of inevitability, and his narrative exploits what every reader must know: there will be no happy endings.”

Bibliography 
The following bibliography includes the narrative works of Erich Hackl, but does not include translations or essay collections. Works translated into English are also translated below.

 Auroras Anlaß, 1987 (Aurora's Motive, 1989)
 Abschied von Sidonie, 1989 (Farewell Sidonia, 1991)
 König Wamba, 1991
 Sara und Simón, 1995
 In fester Umarmung, 1996
 Entwurf einer Liebe auf den ersten Blick, 1999 (Narratives of Loving Resistance, 2006)
 Der Träumer Krivanek, 2000
 Die Hochzeit von Auschwitz, 2002 (The Wedding in Auschwitz, 2006)
 Anprobieren eines Vaters, 2004
 Als ob ein Engel, 2007 (Argentina's Angel 2014)
 Familie Salzmann, 2010
 Dieses Buch gehört meiner Mutter, 2013
 Drei tränenlose Geschichten, 2014
 Am Seil, 2018
 Im Leben mehr Glück, 2019

References

1954 births
Living people
20th-century Austrian novelists
21st-century Austrian novelists
Austrian male novelists
University of Salamanca alumni
20th-century Austrian male writers
21st-century male writers